The Town Hall of Kandy is the headquarters of the Kandy Municipal Council and the office of the Mayor of Kandy. 

The building known as the Dunuwille Walawwe was acquired by the Municipal Council in 1870 at a court sanctioned auction, conducted to settle the “Death Duty” (Estate Tax) on the estate of Deputy Queen's Advocate, James Alexander Dunuwille (1821–1866). The building was purchased for approximately £480. It was initially used as the city's Town Hall. It currently houses the Council's administrative staff.

External links
The History of the Municipal Council

Further reading

References

Archaeological protected monuments in Kandy District
British colonial architecture in Sri Lanka
City and town halls in Sri Lanka
Houses in Kandy
Manor houses in Sri Lanka